Magni Smedås (born 17 June 1995) is a Norwegian cross-country skier.

She competed in three events at the 2013 European Youth Olympic Winter Festival, collecting 17th and 23rd places. She made her World Cup debut in February 2019 in the sprint event at Cogne, collecting her first World Cup points with a 25th place. Competing in three more World Cup races on the 2018–2019 circuit, she made her breakthrough in December 2019 when finishing 8th in the 10 kilometres event in Davos. On 29 January 2023, she won Marcialonga.

She represents the sports club Lillehammer SK. She hails from Os i Østerdalen and is a second cousin of Therese Johaug.

Cross-country skiing results
All results are sourced from the International Ski Federation (FIS).

World Cup

Season standings

References

External links

1995 births
Living people
People from Os, Innlandet
Norwegian female cross-country skiers
Tour de Ski skiers
Sportspeople from Innlandet